This is a list of the individuals who were, at any given time, considered the next in line to inherit the throne of Scotland, should the incumbent monarch die. Those who actually succeeded (at any future time) are shown in bold. Stillborn children and infants surviving less than a month are not included.

It may be noted that although the Crown could pass through the female line (for example to the House of Dunkeld in 1034), in the High Middle Ages it is doubtful whether a queen regnant would have been accepted as ruler.

Significant breaks in the succession, where the designated heir did not in fact succeed (due to usurpation, conquest, revolution, or lack of heirs) are shown as breaks in the table below.

The symbols +1, +2, etc. are to be read "once (twice, etc.) removed in descendancy", i.e., the child or grandchild (etc.) of a cousin of the degree specified. The symbols -1, -2, etc. indicate the converse relationship, i.e., the cousin of a parent or grandparent (etc.).

1124 to 1290

1292 to 1296

1306 to 1371

1371 to 1707

Jacobite succession, 1689–1807
The following are the heirs of the Jacobite pretenders to the throne to the death of the last Stuart pretender. For other persons in this lineage, see Jacobite succession.

See also
 Family tree of Scottish monarchs
 List of heirs to the British throne
 List of heirs to the English throne

References

http://www.burkes-peerage.net/articles/roking.aspx
http://www.wargs.com/essays/succession/strathearn.html

Scotland-related lists
 
Scotland
British monarchy-related lists
Scottish history-related lists